Morten Andersen (born 1960) is a Danish-born former American football kicker.

Morten Andersen may also refer to:

Sports
 Morten Beck Andersen (born 1988), Danish football forward
 Morten Bertolt Andersen (born 1984), Danish football midfielder
 Morten Hedegaard Andersen (born 1972), Danish cricketer

Others
 Morten Andersen (painter) (born 1976), Danish painter
 Morten Andersen (photographer), Danish fashion photographer